Georg Zeppenfeld (born 1970) is a German operatic bass.

Life 
About his voice training the singer said: "As a Westphalian one is not necessarily born for operatic singing. Where we speak, i.e. in the back of the throat, is not normally where one sings. It took a long time and a lot of patience from my voice teacher before I understood how to bring the voice forward."

Zeppenfeld was awarded the title Sächsischer Kammersänger (Staatsoper Dresden) in 2015.

Discography 
There are numerous recordings of Zeppenfeld's work, among them Verdi's Messa da Requiem, published live by Arte from the Dresden Semperoper and on DVD under the direction of Daniele Gatti on the 60th anniversary of the destruction of Dresden. CD recordings were made for Deutsche Grammophon, Deutsche Harmonia Mundi, Oehms Classics and others, radio and television productions with Westdeutscher, Mitteldeutscher, Norddeutscher and Bayerischer Rundfunk, Deutschlandfunk, ORF, 3sat, arte, R.T. Svizzera Italiana, Radio France among others.

References

External links 
 Georg Zeppenfeld Salzburger Festspiele
 Georg Zeppenfeld Bayreuther Festspiele
 Recordings on Operabase
 

1970 births
Living people
People from Olpe (district)
German operatic basses
20th-century German male opera singers
21st-century German male opera singers